Ilishevo (İleş) is a rural locality (a village) in Yabalakovsky Selsoviet, Ilishevsky District, Bashkortostan, Russia. The population was 409 as of 2010. There are 4 streets.

Geography 
Ilishevo is located 30 km northwest of Verkhneyarkeyevo (the district's administrative centre) by road. Yabalakovo is the nearest rural locality.

References 

Rural localities in Ilishevsky District